Bunker Hill High School is a public, coeducational high school located in Claremont, North Carolina, United States.  It is part of the Catawba County Schools district.

Notable alumni
 Teresa Earnhardt, wife of Dale Earnhardt Sr., former NASCAR team owner
 Landon Huffman, stock car racing driver

References

Public high schools in North Carolina
Educational institutions established in 1954
Schools in Catawba County, North Carolina
1954 establishments in North Carolina